Pál Sajgó (28 June 1922 – 18 April 2016) was a Hungarian cross-country skier and biathlete who competed in the 1950s. He was born in Gheorgheni. At the 1952 Winter Olympics in Oslo, he finished 53rd in the 18 km event and 27th in the 50 km event. Eight years later he finished 34th in the 15 km event. In the 20 km biathlon competition he finished 26th.

External links
18 km Olympic cross country results: 1948-52
Olympic 50 km cross country skiing results: 1948-64
Pál Sajgó's obituary 

1922 births
2016 deaths
People from Gheorgheni
Hungarian male cross-country skiers
Hungarian male biathletes
Olympic cross-country skiers of Hungary
Olympic biathletes of Hungary
Cross-country skiers at the 1952 Winter Olympics
Cross-country skiers at the 1960 Winter Olympics
Biathletes at the 1960 Winter Olympics
20th-century Hungarian people